A steam explosion is an explosion caused by violent boiling or flashing of water or ice into steam, occurring when water or ice is either superheated, rapidly heated by fine hot debris produced within it, or heated by the interaction of molten metals  (as in a fuel–coolant interaction, or FCI, of molten nuclear-reactor fuel rods with water in a nuclear reactor core following a core-meltdown). Pressure vessels, such as pressurized water (nuclear) reactors, that operate above atmospheric pressure can also provide the conditions for a steam explosion. The water changes from a solid or liquid to a gas with extreme speed, increasing dramatically in volume. A steam explosion sprays steam and boiling-hot water and the hot medium that heated it in all directions (if not otherwise confined, e.g. by the walls of a container), creating a danger of scalding and burning.

Steam explosions are not normally chemical explosions, although a number of substances react chemically with steam (for example, zirconium and superheated graphite (inpure carbon, C) react with steam and air respectively to give off hydrogen (H2), which may explode violently in air (O2) to form water or H2O) so that chemical explosions and fires may follow. Some steam explosions appear to be special kinds of boiling liquid expanding vapor explosion (BLEVE), and rely on the release of stored superheat. But many large-scale events, including foundry accidents, show evidence of an energy-release front propagating through the material (see description of FCI below), where the forces create fragments and mix the hot phase into the cold volatile one; and the rapid heat transfer at the front sustains the propagation.

If a steam explosion occurs in a confined tank of water due to rapid heating of the water, the pressure wave and rapidly expanding steam can cause severe water hammer. In the case of SL-1, the fuel and fuel elements vaporized from instantaneous overheating.

Events of this general type are also possible if the fuel and fuel elements of a water-cooled nuclear reactor gradually melt. The mixture of molten core structures and fuel is often referred to as "Corium". If such corium comes into contact with water, vapour explosions may occur from the violent interaction between molten fuel (corium) and water as coolant. Such explosions are seen to be fuel–coolant interactions (FCI).

The severity of a steam explosion based on fuel-coolant interaction (FCI) depends strongly on the so-called premixing process, which describes the mixing of the melt with the surrounding water-steam mixture. In general, water-rich premixtures are considered more favorable than steam-rich environments in terms of steam explosion initiation and strength.
The theoretical maximum for the strength of a steam explosion from a given mass of molten corium, which can never be achieved in practice, is due to its optimal distribution in the form of molten corium droplets of a certain size. These droplets are surrounded by a suitable volume of water, which in principle results from the max. possible mass of vaporized water at instantaneous heat exchange between the molten droplet fragmenting in a shock wave and the surrounding water. On the basis of this very conservative assumption, calculations for alpha containment failure were carried out by Theofanous.
However, these optimal conditions used for conservative estimates do not occur in the real world. For one thing, the entire molten reactor core will never be in premixture, but only in the form of a part of it, e.g., as a jet of molten corium impinging a water pool in the lower plenum of the reactor, fragmenting there by ablation and allowing by this the formation of a premixture in the vicinity of the melt jet falling through the water pool. Alternatively, the melt may arrive as a thick jet at the bottom of the lower plenum, where it forms a pool of melt overlaid by a pool of water. In this case, a premixing zone can form at the interface between the melt pool and the water pool. In both cases, it is clear that by far not the entire molten reactor inventory is involved in premixing, but rather only a small percentage. Further limitations arise from the saturated nature of the water in the reactor, i.e., water with appreciable supercooling is not present there. In the case of penetration of a fragmenting melt jet there, this leads to increasing evaporation and an increasing steam content in the premixture, which, from a content > 70% in the water/steam mixture, prevents the explosion altogether or at least limits its strength. Another counter-effect is the solidification of the molten particles, which depends, among other things, on the diameter of the molten particles. That is, small particles solidify faster than larger ones. Furthermore, the models for instability growth at interfaces between flowing media (e.g. Kelvin-Helmholtz, Rayleigh-Taylor, Conte-Miles, ...) show a correlation between particle size after fragmentation and the ratio of the density of the fragmenting medium (water-vapor mixture) to the density of the fragmented medium, which can also be demonstrated experimentally. In the case of corium (density of ~ 8000 kg/m³), much smaller droplets (~ 3 - 4 mm) result than when alumina (Al2O3) is used as a corium simulant with a density of just under half that of corium with droplet sizes in the range of 1 - 2 cm. Jet fragmentation experiments conducted at JRC ISPRA under typical reactor conditions with masses of molten corium up to 200 kg and melt jet diameters of 5 - 10 cm in diameter in pools of saturated water up to 2 m deep resulted in success with respect to steam explosions only when Al2O3 was used as the corium simulant. Despite various efforts on the part of the experimenters, it was never possible to trigger a steam explosion in the corium experiments in FARO.(Will be continued ...)

In these events the passage of the pressure wave through the predispersed material creates flow forces which further fragment the melt, resulting in rapid heat transfer, and thus sustaining the wave. Much of the physical destruction in the Chernobyl disaster, a graphite-moderated, light-water-cooled RBMK-1000 reactor, is thought to have been due to such a steam explosion.

In a nuclear meltdown, the most severe outcome of a steam explosion is early containment building failure. Two possibilities are the ejection at high pressure of molten fuel into the containment, causing rapid heating; or an in-vessel steam explosion causing ejection of a missile  (such as the upper head) into, and through, the containment. Less dramatic but still significant is that the molten mass of fuel and reactor core melts through the floor of the reactor building and reaches ground water; a steam explosion might occur, but the debris would probably be contained, and would in fact, being dispersed, probably be more easily cooled. See WASH-1400 for details.

Steam explosions are often encountered where hot lava meets sea water or ice. Such an occurrence is also called a littoral explosion. A dangerous steam explosion can also be created when liquid water or ice encounters hot, molten metal. As the water explodes into steam, it splashes the burning hot liquid metal along with it, causing an extreme risk of severe burns to anyone located nearby and creating a fire hazard.

Practical uses

Biomass Refinement
Steam explosive biorefinement is an industrial application to valorize biomass.  It involves pressurizing biomass with steam at up to 3MPa (10 atmospheres) and instantaneously releasing the pressure to produce the desired transformation in the biomass. An industrial application of the concept has been shown for a paper fiber project.

Steam turbines

A water vapor explosion creates a high volume of gas without producing environmentally harmful leftovers. The controlled explosion of water has been used for generating steam in power stations and in modern types of steam turbines. Newer steam engines use heated oil to force drops of water to explode and create high pressure in a controlled chamber. The pressure is then used to run a turbine or a converted combustion engine. Hot oil and water explosions are becoming particularly popular in concentrated solar generators, because the water can be separated from the oil in a closed loop without any external energy. Water explosion is considered to be environmentally friendly if the heat is generated by a renewable resource.

Flash boiling in cooking
A cooking technique called flash boiling uses a small amount of water to quicken the process of boiling.  For example, this technique can be used to melt a slice of cheese onto a hamburger patty. The cheese slice is placed on top of the meat on a hot surface such as a frying pan, and a small quantity of cold water is thrown onto the surface near the patty. A vessel (such as a pot or frying-pan cover) is then used to quickly seal the steam-flash reaction, dispersing much of the steamed water on the cheese and patty. This results in a large release of heat, transferred via vaporized water condensing back into a liquid (a principle also used in refrigerator and freezer production).

Other uses
Internal combustion engines may use flash-boiling to aerosolize the fuel.

Other rapid boiling phenomena

High steam generation rates can occur under other circumstances, such as boiler-drum failure, or at a quench front (for example when water re-enters a hot dry boiler). Though potentially damaging, they are usually less energetic than events in which the hot ("fuel") phase is molten and so can be finely fragmented within the volatile ("coolant") phase. Some examples follow:

Steam explosions are naturally produced by certain volcanoes, especially stratovolcanoes, and are a major cause of human fatalities in volcanic eruptions.

In January 1961, operator error caused the SL-1 reactor to instantly destroy itself in a steam explosion. The 1986 Chernobyl nuclear disaster in the Soviet Union was feared to cause major steam explosion (and resulting Europe-wide nuclear fallout) upon melting the lava-like nuclear fuel through the reactor's basement towards contact with residue fire-fighting water and groundwater. The threat was averted by frantic tunneling underneath the reactor in order to pump out water and reinforce underlying soil with concrete.

When a pressurized container such as the waterside of a steam boiler ruptures, it is always followed by some degree of steam explosion. A steam boiler has an interface of steam and water in the steam drum, which is where the water is finally evaporating due to the heat input, usually oil-fired burners. When a water tube fails due to any of a variety of reasons, it causes the water in the boiler to expand out of the opening into the furnace area that is only a few psi above atmospheric pressure. This will likely extinguish all fires and expands over the large surface area on the sides of the boiler. To decrease the likelihood of a devastating explosion, boilers have gone from the "fire-tube" designs, where the heat was added by passing hot gases through tubes in a body of water, to "water-tube" boilers that have the water inside of the tubes and the furnace area is around the tubes. Old "fire-tube" boilers often failed due to poor build quality or lack of maintenance (such as corrosion of the fire tubes, or fatigue of the boiler shell due to constant expansion and contraction). A failure of fire tubes forces large volumes of high pressure, high temperature steam back down the fire tubes in a fraction of a second and often blows the burners off the front of the boiler, whereas a failure of the pressure vessel surrounding the water would lead to a full and entire evacuation of the boiler's contents in a large steam explosion. On a marine boiler, this would certainly destroy the ship's propulsion plant and possibly the corresponding end of the ship.

In a more domestic setting, steam explosions can be a result of trying to extinguish burning oil with water in a process called boilover. When oil in a pan is on fire, the natural impulse may be to extinguish it with water; however, doing so will cause the hot oil to superheat the water. The resulting steam will disperse upwards and outwards rapidly and violently in a spray also containing the ignited oil. The correct method to extinguish such fires is to use either a damp cloth or a tight lid on the pan; both methods deprive the fire of oxygen, and the cloth also cools it down. Alternatively, a non-volatile purpose designed fire retardant agent or simply a fire blanket can be used.

See also
 BLEVE
 Boiler explosion
 Multiphase flow
 2007 New York City steam explosion
 Chernobyl Disaster

Bibliography
Triggered Steam Explosions  by Lloyd S. Nelson, Paul W. Brooks, Riccardo Bonazza and Michael L. Corradini ... Kjetil Hildal

References

Explosion protection
Explosives
Nuclear accidents and incidents
Water in gas

ja:水蒸気爆発